Percival Wilde (New York City, March 1, 1887 – September 19, 1953) was an American author and playwright who wrote novels and numerous short stories and one-act plays. He also authored a textbook on the theater arts.  Native to New York City, Wilde graduated from Columbia University in 1906, and worked for a time as a banker. He began writing plays in 1912, and joined The Lambs Club in 1947.

Wilde's plays were especially popular in the Little Theatre Movement.

List of works

Novels 

The Devil's Booth (1930)
 Mystery Week-End (1938)
 Inquest (1938)
 Design for Murder (1941)

Collections of short stories 
 Rogues in Clover (1929)
 P. Moran, Operative (1947)

Plays 
 Dawn and One Act Plays Of Life Today (1915) 
Dawn
The Hour of Truth
The Noble Lord
The Traitor
A House of Cards
Playing With Fire
The Finger of God
Confessional, and Other American Plays (1916)
 Confessional
 The Beautiful Story 
 The Villain in the Piece 
 A Question of Morality 
 According to Darwin 
 The Unseen Host, and Other War Plays (1917) 
 The Reckoning (1930) 
 Eight Comedies For Little Theaters

Films (Story) 
 Moonlight Follies (1921)
 The Guttersnipe (1922)
 The Rise of Duton Lang (1955)

Nonfiction 
 The Craftmanship of One-Act Plays (1923)

References

External links 

 
 
 
 
 Wilde, Percival (Open Library)
 
 Finding aid to Percival Wilde letters at Columbia University. Rare Book & Manuscript Library.

1887 births
1953 deaths
20th-century American dramatists and playwrights
20th-century American male writers
20th-century American novelists
American male dramatists and playwrights
American male novelists
Columbia University alumni